Integrated electric propulsion (IEP) or full electric propulsion (FEP) or integrated full electric propulsion (IFEP) is an arrangement of marine propulsion systems such that gas turbines or diesel generators or both generate three-phase  electricity which is then used to power electric motors turning either propellers or waterjet impellors.  It is a modification of the combined diesel-electric and gas propulsion system for ships which eliminates the need for clutches and reduces or eliminates the need for gearboxes by using electrical transmission rather than mechanical transmission of energy, so it is a series hybrid electric propulsion, instead of parallel.

Integrated system 

Eliminating the mechanical connection between the engines and the propulsion has several advantages including increased freedom of placement of the engines, acoustical decoupling of the engines from the hull which makes the ship less noisy, and a reduction of weight and volume. Reducing acoustic signature is particularly important to naval vessels seeking to avoid detection and to cruise ships seeking to provide passengers with a pleasant voyage, but is of less benefit to cargo ships.  Because ships require electricity even when not underway, having all of the engines produce electricity reduces the number of engines needed compared to more traditional arrangements in which one pool of engines provides electricity and another pool of engines provides propulsion, reducing capital costs and maintenance costs.

A typical integrated electric propulsion arrangement on larger (e.g. cruise ships) and naval vessels includes both diesel generators and gas turbines.  On smaller vessels (which make up the majority of IEP vessels) the engines are typically just diesel.  The advantages of gas turbines include much lower weight. and smaller size than diesels of similar power, and much less noise and vibration, but they are efficient only at or near maximum power. Diesel generators have the advantage of high efficiency over a wide range of power levels.  Using them in combination allows for the benefits of a full range of operational efficiency, a low-vibration quiet mode of operation, and some reduction in weight and volume relative to a diesel-only arrangement.  In naval vessels, a pool of diesel generators are typically used to provide a base load and enough power to achieve cruise speed.  The gas turbines are used to provide peak power for higher speeds and may be required to operate weapon systems with high power demands.  In passenger ships, one or more gas turbines are used for fast cruising.  The diesels provide reliable redundancy and an efficient source of electricity when in port, at anchor, or drifting.

A diesel-electric system is an integrated electric propulsion system in which no gas turbines are used and all of the engines are diesel.

A turbine-electric system is also possible using gas turbine generators.  Some yachts use only gas turbines for integrated electric propulsion without any diesel engines.  If electric propulsion is used via electric motor on shaft, or integrated into the main reduction gear driving the shaft, greater power available is realized faster than using diesels.  In addition, an on-shaft permanent magnet motor drive system also utilizing gas turbine Prime Movers on the main reduction gear, can also provide electricity when driven by the Prime Movers.  The on-shaft permanent magnet electric motors provide propulsion at lower speeds via on-board electrical power generation gas turbine or diesel, at significant fuel savings. If a fleet wide usage is analyzed, significant logistical advantages are realized over time. Compared to diesel, it increases flexibility, versatility and efficiency, with capability of transforming to provide propulsion or electrical power more rapidly, which ever the situation dictates.

Reducing pollution 
In Norway gas electric hybrid propulsion is being used on a fleet of fully electric and plug-in hybrid ferries that cross fjords. Capable of travelling at 17-18 knots, these ships reduce total NOx by 8,000 tonnes per year and CO2 emissions by 300,000 tonnes per annum. Saving a million litres of diesel per year per ferry, the ferries recharge their batteries overnight and top them up from shorepower at each port of call.

List of IEP ships
 Type 45 Destroyer (Royal Navy)
  (US Navy)
  (Cunard Line)
  (US Navy)
  (Royal Navy)
  LHD (Spanish Navy)
  LHD (Royal Australian Navy)
  (Japan Maritime Self-Defense Force)
 Nichinan-class oceanographic survey ship (Japan Maritime Self Defence Force) 
 Shounan-class oceanographic survey ship (Japan Maritime Self Defence Force)
 Leeuwin-class Hydrographic Ship (Royal Australian Navy)

See also
 Electric boat
 DC distribution system (ship propulsion)

References

Electric boats
Marine propulsion
Hybrid electric vehicles